Gloss is a superhero published by DC Comics created by Steve Engelhart and Joe Staton who first appeared in Millennium #2 (January 1988).

Fictional character biography
The creators of the Green Lantern Corps, the Guardians, had planned to create their successors, a race of new Guardians on Earth, so one of their number met a female alien called a Zamaron. The two channeled their powers into the "Millennium Project", gathering ten individuals together, teaching them about the nature of the cosmos, and endowing them with immortality and metahuman powers. One of these was a young woman from China named Xiang Po, to whom the Guardians gave the power to draw energy from the Earth's "Dragon Lines" (or ley lines). She became Gloss (and a redhead), and joined the other heroes the Guardians had made in the team named the New Guardians. When the then powerless Guy Gardner comes to the team's island home in order to take over, she becomes so disgusted with his crass ways she ends up throwing him far into the ocean.

Gloss was originally on a mission to pass on her enhanced DNA to her offspring, and was seeking a suitable mate, but she abandoned her quest when the team disbanded.

Gloss is briefly seen in issue number 50 of the maxi-series "52". Gloss, along with other superpowered beings including Manticore and Tasmanian Devil, are seen knocked down after a battle with the rage maddened Black Adam.

One Year Later
In the events of One Year Later, Gloss is now a Global Guardian, and follows her former teammate Jet, who is now team leader.
She is killed by Prometheus, who slew her along with several of her fellow Global Guardians.

Following the reboot of the DC Universe with the New 52, Gloss was restored to life. She was seen as part of the Great Twenty, China's new team of superheroes.

Powers and abilities
 Gloss has immortality and the power to draw energy from the Dragon Lines (Ley Lines) of the Earth. 
 These lines of mystic power infuse her with incredible strength and make her incredibly durable. 
 She can command the Dragon Lines, manipulating the Earth's energy to create earthquakes and affect local ecosystems. Xiang can also manipulate the elements at will.

References

External links
DCU Guide: Gloss

Characters created by Steve Englehart
DC Comics characters with superhuman strength
DC Comics female superheroes
DC Comics metahumans
Comics characters introduced in 1988
Chinese superheroes